Mohamed Awadalla (born 16 July 2002) is a Sudanese footballer born in Emirates who currently plays as a forward for Al Ain.

Career statistics

Club

Notes

References

External links
 

2002 births
Living people
Sudanese footballers
Sudanese expatriate footballers
Association football forwards
UAE Pro League players
Al Ain FC players
Expatriate footballers in the United Arab Emirates